Frank Beswick, Baron Beswick,  (21 August 1911 – 17 August 1987) was a British Labour Co-operative politician.

Born in 1911 in Nottingham, Beswick's father was a coal miner. He was educated in Nottingham and then at the Working Men's College in London. He became a journalist and was elected to the London County Council. He was in Spain during the Spanish Civil War.

Already a qualified pilot, he joined the Royal Air Force Volunteer Reserve during the Second World War and served with Transport Command. A Sergeant Pilot, he was commissioned Pilot Officer in April 1942, and promoted Flying Officer in October 1942 and Flight Lieutenant in March 1944. He remained in the RAFVR after the war, resigning his commission in 1952.

Beswick was elected to Parliament for Uxbridge in 1945 and served until 1959. He was one of the British observers at the 1946 Bikini atomic tests. Following Labour's loss at the 1951 election, he became civil aviation correspondent for the Reynolds News, having been Parliamentary Secretary to the Minister of Civil Aviation. When he lost his seat in 1959, he was appointed political secretary of the London Co-operative Society.

He was created Baron Beswick, of Hucknall in the County of Nottinghamshire, on 18 December 1964. He served as Parliamentary Under Secretary of State in the Commonwealth Office from 1965 then became Government Chief Whip in the House of Lords in 1967. Continuing in the whip role into Opposition in 1970, in 1974 he was appointed Minister of State for Industry and Deputy Leader of the House of Lords, serving until 1975, and later became the first Chairman of British Aerospace. In 1975 he was UK signatory of the convention establishing the European Space Agency.

In 1985 he opened the first ever televised debate in the Lords.

References

External links 
 

 
 

 
 

 

 
 
 

1911 births
1987 deaths
British male journalists
Honourable Corps of Gentlemen at Arms
Labour Co-operative MPs for English constituencies
Labour Party (UK) life peers
Members of London County Council
Members of the Privy Council of the United Kingdom
Ministers in the Attlee governments, 1945–1951
Ministers in the Wilson governments, 1964–1970
UK MPs 1945–1950
UK MPs 1950–1951
UK MPs 1951–1955
UK MPs 1955–1959
UK MPs who were granted peerages
Royal Air Force Volunteer Reserve personnel of World War II
Royal Air Force officers
Royal Air Force pilots of World War II
Life peers created by Elizabeth II